Sun, Stone, and Shadows: 20 Great Mexican Short Stories, edited by Jorge Hernandez, and published by Fondo de Cultura Economica, is a collection of short stories written by Mexican authors born in the first half of the twentieth century.

It is one of the books selected for the National Endowment for the Arts' "Big Read" nationwide literacy initiative.

Contents
Introduction, Jorge Hernandez

The Fantastic Unreal
 My Life with the Wave, by Octavio Paz
 Chac-Mool, by Carlos Fuentes
 History According to Pao Cheng, by Salvador Elizondo
 The Night of Margaret Rose, by Francisco Tario

Scenes from Mexican Reality
 The Mist, by Juan de la Cabada
 The Little Doe, by Jose Revueltas
 The Medicine Man, by Francisco Rojas Gonzalez
 Blame the Tlaxcaltecs, by Elena Garro

The Tangible Past
 The Dinner, by Alfonso Reyes
 Tell Them Not to Kill Me!, by Juan Rulfo
 The Carnival of the Bullets, by Martin Luis Guzman
 Permission Granted, by Edmundo Valades

The Unexpected in Everyday, Urban Life
 The Shunammite, by Ines Arredondo
 Cooking Lesson, by Rosario Castellanos
 Tachas, by Efren Hernandez
 What Became of Pampa Hash?, by Jorge Ibarguengoitia

Intimate Imagination
 The Switchman, by Juan Jose Arreola
 The Square, by Juan Garcia Ponce
 The Panther, by Sergio Pitol
 August Afternoon, by Jose Emilio Pacheco

Fiction anthologies
2008 anthologies
Fondo de Cultura Económica books
Mexican fiction